"I'll Be There" is the third single the vocal group Bright released under a major label named Rhythm Zone. The song Killing Me Softly with His Song is a cover song from Roberta Flack (originally sung by Lori Lieberman).
I'll be there ranked weekly on the Oricon ranking on #48 and sold 2,127 in its first week.

Track listings

CD track list
I'll Be There
Killing Me Softly With His Song
Itsu made mo – Happy Winter version
I'll Be There (instrumental)
Killing Me Softly With His Song (instrumental)
Itsu made mo – Happy Winter version (instrumental)

DVD track list
 I’ll Be There /music video
 One Summer Time /live video from Big Cat, Aug. 25th 2008
 Watch Out /live video from Big Cat, Aug. 25th 2008
 I’ll Be There /making video

Chart

References

2008 singles
Bright (Japanese band) songs
2008 songs
Rhythm Zone singles
Song articles with missing songwriters